Marxian class theory asserts that an individual's position within a class hierarchy is determined by their role in the production process, and argues that political and ideological consciousness is determined by class position. A class is those who share common economic interests, are conscious of those interests, and engage in collective action which advances those interests. Within Marxian class theory, the structure of the production process forms the basis of class construction.

To Marx, a class is a group with intrinsic tendencies and interests that differ from those of other groups within society, the basis of a fundamental antagonism between such groups. For example, it is in the laborer's best interest to maximize wages and benefits and in the capitalist's best interest to maximize profit at the expense of such, leading to a contradiction within the capitalist system, even if the laborers and capitalists themselves are unaware of the clash of interests.

Marxian class theory has been open to a range of alternate positions, most notably from scholars such as E. P. Thompson and Mario Tronti. Both Thompson and Tronti suggest class consciousness within the production process precedes the formation of productive relationships. In this sense, Marxian class theory often relates to discussion over pre-existing class struggles.

Origins of Karl Marx's theory
Karl Marx's class theory derives from a range of philosophical schools of thought including left Hegelianism, Scottish Empiricism, and Anglo-French political-economics. Marx's view of class originated from a series of personal interests relating to social alienation and human struggle, whereby the formation of class structure relates to acute historical consciousness.  Political-economics also contributed to Marx's theories, centering on the concept of "origin of income" where society is divided into three sub-groups: Rentiers, Capitalist, and Worker. This construction is based on David Ricardo's theory of capitalism. Marx strengthened this with a discussion over verifiable class relationships.

Marx sought to define class as embedded in productive relations rather than social status. His political and economic thought developed towards an interest in production as opposed to distribution, and this henceforth became a central theme in his concept of class.

Class structure
Marx distinguishes one class from another on the basis of two criteria: ownership of the means of production and control of the labor power of others. From this, Marx states "Society as a whole is more and more splitting up into two great hostile camps, into two great classes directly facing each other":

I. Capitalists, or bourgeoisie, own the means of production and purchase the labor power of others

II. Workers, or proletariat, do not own any means of production or the ability to purchase the labor power of others. Rather, they sell their own labor power.

Class is thus determined by property relations, not by income or status. These factors are determined by distribution and consumption, which mirror the production and power relations of classes.

The Manifesto of the Communist Party describes two additional classes that “decay and finally disappear in the face of Modern Industry”:

III. A small, transitional class known as the petite bourgeoisie own sufficient means of production but do not purchase labor power.  Marx's Communist Manifesto fails to properly define the petite bourgeoisie beyond “smaller capitalists” (Marx and Engels, 1848, 25).

IV. The “dangerous class”, or Lumpenproletariat, “the social scum, that passively rotting mass thrown off by the lowest layers of the old society.”

Conflict as the nature of class relations
"The history of all hitherto existing society is the history of class struggles… Freeman and slave, patrician and plebeian, lord and serf, guild-master and journeyman, in a word, oppressor and oppressed, stood in constant opposition to one another, carried on an uninterrupted, now hidden, now open fight, a fight that each time ended, either in a revolutionary reconstruction of society at large, or in the common ruin of the contending classes.... The modern bourgeois society that has sprouted from the ruins of feudal society has not done away with class antagonisms. It has but established new classes, new conditions of oppression, new forms of struggle in place of the old ones. Our epoch, the epoch of the bourgeoisie, possesses, however, this distinctive feature: it has simplified class antagonisms. Society as a whole is more and more splitting up into two great hostile camps, into two great classes directly facing each other: Bourgeoisie and Proletariat.” – Communist Manifesto

Marx established conflict as the key driving force of history and the main determinant of social trajectories (Kingston).  However, in order to understand the nature of “class conflict,” we must first understand that such conflict arises from a unified class interest, also known as class consciousness.  Class consciousness is an aspect of Marxist theory, referring to the self-awareness of social classes, the capacity to act in its own rational interests, or measuring the extent to which an individual is conscious of the historical tasks their class (or class allegiance) sets for them.

Moreover, by definition, the objective interests of classes are fundamentally in opposition; consequently, these opposing interests and consciousnesses eventually lead to class conflict.

Marx first saw the development of class conflict confined to individual factories and capitalists.  However, given the maturation of capitalism, the life conditions of bourgeoisie and proletariat began to grow more disparate.  This increased polarization and homogenization within classes fostered an environment for individual struggles to become more generalized.  When increasing class conflict is manifested at the societal level, class consciousness and common interests are also increased.  Consequently, when class consciousness is augmented, policies are organized to ensure the duration of such interest for the ruling class.  Here begins the use of the struggle for political power and classes become political forces.

Since the distribution of political power is determined by power over production, or power over capital, it is no surprise that the bourgeois class uses their wealth to legitimatize and protect their property and consequent social relations.  Thus the ruling class is those who hold the economic power and make the decisions (Dahrendorf).

Class structure of capitalism 
In Marxist theory, the capitalist stage of production consists of two main classes: the bourgeoisie, the capitalists who own the means of production, and the much larger proletariat (or 'working class') who must sell their own labour power (See also: wage labour). This is the fundamental economic structure of work and property (See also: wage labour), a state of inequality that is normalised and reproduced through cultural ideology. Thus the proletariat, in itself, is forced into a subservient position by the power of capital, which has stripped the means of production from them. As the proletariat becomes conscious of its situation and power, organizes itself, and takes collective political action it becomes a class for itself which has the revolutionary potential to become the ruling class.

Max Weber critiqued historical materialism, positing that stratification is not based purely on economic inequalities but on other status and power differentials. Social class pertaining broadly to material wealth may be distinguished from status class based on honour, prestige, religious affiliation, and so on. The conditions of capitalism and its class system came together due to a variety of "elective affinities". 

Marxists explain the history of "civilized" societies in terms of a war of classes between those who control production and those who produce the goods or services in society. In the Marxist view of capitalism, this is a conflict between capitalists (bourgeoisie) and wage-workers (the proletariat). For Marxists, class antagonism is rooted in the situation that control over social production necessarily entails control over the class which produces goods—in capitalism this is the exploitation of workers by the bourgeoisie.

Marx himself argued that it was the goal of the proletariat itself to displace the capitalist system with socialism, changing the social relationships underpinning the class system and then developing into a future communist society in which: "..the free development of each is the condition for the free development of all." (Communist Manifesto) This would mark the beginning of a classless society in which human needs rather than profit would be motive for production. In a society with democratic control and production for use, there would be no class, no state and no need for money.

For Marx, class has three primary facts:
Objective factors A class shares a common relationship to the means of production.  That is, all people in one class make their living in a common way in terms of ownership of the things that produce social goods.  A class may own things, own land, own people, be owned, own nothing but their labor.  A class will extract tax, produce agriculture, enslave and work others, be enslaved and work, or work for a wage.
Subjective factors The members will necessarily have some perception of their similarity and common interest. Marx termed this Class consciousness.  Class consciousness is not simply an awareness of one's own class interest (for instance, the maximisation of shareholder value; or, the maximization of the wage with the minimization of the working day), class consciousness also embodies deeply shared views of how society should be organized legally, culturally, socially and politically.
Reproduction of class relations Class as a set of social relationships that is reproduced from one generation to the next.

The first criterion divides a society into the owners and non-owners of means of production. In capitalism, these are capitalist (bourgeoisie) and proletariat. Finer divisions can be made, however: the most important subgroup in capitalism being petite bourgeoisie (small bourgeoisie), people who possess their own means of production but utilize it primarily by working on it themselves rather than hiring others to work on it. They include self-employed artisans, small shopkeepers, and many professionals. Jon Elster has found mention in Marx of 15 classes from various historical periods.

Vladimir Lenin has defined classes as "large groups of people differing from each other by the place they occupy in a historically determined system of social production, by their relation (in most cases fixed and formulated in law) to the means of production, by their role in the social organization of labor, and, consequently, by the dimensions of the share of social wealth of which they dispose and the mode of acquiring it."

Proletarianisation 
The most important transformation of society for Marxists has been the massive and rapid growth of the proletariat over the last two hundred and fifty years. Starting with agricultural and domestic textile laborers in England and Flanders, more and more occupations only provide a living through wages or salaries. Private manufacturing, leading to self-employment, is no longer as viable as it was before the industrial revolution, because automation made manufacturing very cheap. Many people who once controlled their own labor-time were converted into proletarians through industrialization. Today groups which in the past subsisted on stipends or private wealth—like doctors, academics or lawyers—are now increasingly working as wage laborers.  Marxists call this process proletarianization, and point to it as the major factor in the proletariat being the largest class in current societies in the rich countries of the "first world."

Prediction of socialist revolution
Marx predicts revolution in capitalist society into socialist society because of eventual discontent.  The socialization of labor, in the growth of large-scale production, capitalist interest groups and organizations, as well as in the enormous increase in the dimensions and power of finance capital provides the principal material foundation for the unavoidable arrival of socialism. The physical, intellectual and moral perpetrator of this transformation is the proletariat.  The proletariat's struggle against the bourgeoisie inevitably becomes a political struggle with the goal of political conquest by the proletariat. With the domination of the proletariat, the socialization of production cannot help but lead to the means of production to become the property of society.  The direct consequences of this transformation are a drop in labor productivity, a shorter working day, and the replacement of small-scale unified production by collective and improved labor conditions.   
Capitalism breaks for all time the ties between producer and owner, once held by the bond of class conflict.  Now a new union will be formed based on the conscious application of science and the concentration of collective labor. 

He also extended this redistribution to the structure of power in families.  Marx imagined that with socialism women's status would increase, leading to the break-up of the patriarchal family.

"Modern industry, by assigning as it does, an important part in the socially organized process of production, outside the domestic sphere, to women, to young persons, and to children of both sexes, creates a new economic foundation for a higher form of the family and of the relations between the sexes… Moreover, it is obvious that the fact of the collective working group being composed of individuals of both sexes and all ages, must necessarily, under suitable conditions, become a source of human development; although in its spontaneously developed, brutal, capitalistic form, where the laborer exists for the process of production, and not the process of production for the laborer, that fact is a pestiferous source of corruption and slavery." (Capital, Vol. I, Chapter 13).

Objective and subjective factors in class in Marxism
Marxism has a rather heavily defined dialectic between  objective factors (i.e., material conditions, the social structure) and subjective factors (i.e. the conscious organization of class members). While most forms of Marxism analyses sees people's class based on objective factors (class structure), major Marxist trends have made greater use of subjective factors in understanding the history of the working class. E.P. Thompson's The Making of the English Working Class is a definitive example of this "subjective" Marxist trend. Thompson analyses the English working class as a group of people with shared material conditions coming to a positive self-consciousness of their social position. This feature of social class is commonly termed class consciousness in Marxism, a concept which became famous with Georg Lukács' History and Class Consciousness (1923). It is seen as the process of a "class in itself" moving in the direction of a "class for itself", a collective agent that changes history rather than simply being a victim of the historical process. In Lukács' words, the proletariat was the "subject–object of history", and the first class which could separate false consciousness (inherent to the bourgeois's consciousness), which reified economic laws as universal (whereas they are only a consequence of historic capitalism).

Transnational capitalist class
Globalization theorists, such as William I. Robinson, Leslie Sklair, Kees Van Der Pijl, and Jerry Harris, argue that today a transnational capitalist class has emerged.

See also
 Capitalist mode of production
 Economic inequality
 Exploitation (Marxism)
 Mode of production
 Relations of production
Superstructure
 Surplus labor
 Surplus value

References

 
Dahrendorf, Ralf. Class and Class Conflict in Industrial Society. Stanford, Calif.: Stanford University Press, 1959.
David McLellan, ed., "Capital." The Marx-Engels Reader, 1977. Oxford University Press: Great Britain. 
Kingston, Paul W.  The Classless Society. Stanford, Calif.: Stanford University Press, 2000. 
Marx & Engels. The Communist Manifesto. New York: Penguin group, 1998. 
Youth for International Socialism- NewYouth.com

Marxism
Social classes
Marxian economics
Marxist theory
Sociological theories